Two ships of the Imperial Russian Navy have been named Navarin after the Russian victory at the Battle of Navarino in 1827.

  - 20-gun Egyptian corvette captured in 1828 and sold for scrap in 1854.
  - Predreadnought battleship sunk by the Japanese during the Battle of Tsushima in 1905.

Russian Navy ship names